The 2004 United States presidential election in Illinois took place on November 2, 2004, and was part of the 2004 United States presidential election. Voters chose 21 representatives, or electors to the Electoral College, who voted for president and vice president.

Illinois was won by Democratic nominee John Kerry by a 10.3% margin of victory. Prior to the election, all 12 news organizations considered this a state Kerry would win, or otherwise considered as a safe blue state. A reliable blue state that no Republican has won since Bush's father George H. W. Bush in 1988, Illinois voted for Democratic Senator John Kerry in 2004 with almost 55% of the vote.

Kerry's victory in Illinois was primarily due to carrying seventy percent of the vote in the Chicago area's Cook County, where about 43% of Illinois' population resides. Amongst the remaining 57% of the population, President George W. Bush won 54.6% (1,749,203 votes) to 45.3% (1,452,265 votes). President Bush was victorious in Chicago's collar counties, although the results in those counties were narrower than his victories downstate. As of the 2020 presidential election, this was the last presidential election in which a Democrat failed to carry any of Chicago's collar counties. This also remains the only election in which the Republican nominee has won the national popular vote without carrying Illinois. It also marks the only occurrence in which Illinois has voted for the losing candidate in two consecutive presidential elections (after it had voted against Bush in 2000).

Election information
The primaries and general elections coincided with those for Senate and congress, as well as those for state offices.

Turnout

For the state-run primaries (Democratic and Republican), turnout was 25.23%, with 1,801,090 votes cast. For the general election, turnout was 70.33%, with 5,274,322 votes cast.

Primaries

Democratic

The 2004 Illinois Democratic presidential primary was held on March 16 in the U.S. state of Illinois as one of the Democratic Party's statewide nomination contests ahead of the 2004 presidential election.

By the time of the Illinois primary, Kerry was seen as having all but formally secured the nomination.

Republican

The 2004 Illinois Republican presidential primary was held on March 16, 2004 in the U.S. state of Illinois as one of the Republican Party's state primaries ahead of the 2004 presidential election.

Incumbent president George W. Bush won the primary. Bush was running for reelection without a major opponents, and with no opponents on the ballot in Illinois.

Illinois assigned 60 directly-elected delegates (the state had another 13 delegates that were not directly elected by voters). The Illinois primary was a so-called "Loophole" primary. This meant that the statewide presidential preference vote was a "beauty contest", from which no delegates would be assigned. Instead, the delegates were assigned by separate direct-votes on delegate candidates (whose proclaimed presidential preferences were listed beside their names on the ballot). These delegates were noted voted on at-large by a state vote, but rather by congressional district votes. The number of delegates each congressional district would be able to elect had been decided based upon the strength of that district's vote for the Republican nominee (Bush) in the previous 2000 election. This meant that four delegates each were elected from Illinois's 6th, 8th, 10th, 11th, 13th, 14th, 15th, 16th, 18th, and 19th congressional districts, three delegates each were elected from Illinois's 12th and 17th congressional districts, and two delegates each were elected from Illinois's 1st, 2nd, 3rd, 4th, 5th, 7th, and 9th congressional districts 

Ten of the remaining delegates not directly elected by congressional district were selected at the Illinois Republican Party Convention, and were unpledged delegates. The other three would be unplugged ex-officio delegates, roles filled by the states National Committeeman, the National Committeewoman, and the chairman of the Illinois's Republican Party.

Campaign

Predictions
There were 12 news organizations who made state-by-state predictions of the election. Here are their last predictions before election day.

Polling
Kerry won every single pre-election poll. Out of the 12 polls taken, Kerry won 9 of them with 52% or higher. The final 3 polls averaged Kerry leading 54% to Bush with 41%.

Fundraising
Bush raised $6,892,187. Kerry raised $7,100,400.

Advertising and visits
Neither campaign advertised or visited this state during the fall election season because it was expected not to be competitive and Kerry had a solid lead in the state.

Analysis
Illinois has voted for the Democratic presidential candidate in every election from 1992 on, each time by a double-digit margin. Prior to 1992, Illinois was considered a swing state with perhaps a slight Republican lean; until 2000, no Republican had won the White House without carrying Illinois, and it voted Republican in every election from 1952 to 1988 except 1960 and 1964, even voting against Jimmy Carter in his winning 1976 campaign. The blue trend in the "Land of Lincoln" in presidential elections can be largely attributed to the dramatic expansion of the Democratic margin in Cook County, which contains the city of Chicago and its inner suburbs and makes up about 41.2% of the state's population. While Democrats routinely won Cook County following the New Deal realignment except in some Republican landslide years (1952, 1956, 1972), until 1996, they did not themselves crack 60% in the county except in their own landslides of 1936 and 1964. In 1992, however, Clinton got 58.2% of the vote in Cook County, approaching 60% and a higher vote share than any nominee had received in the county since 1964, despite the election having three major participants. In 1996, Clinton got 66.8% of the vote, blowing past Franklin Roosevelt's and Lyndon Johnson's vote shares in 1936 and 1964, respectively, and Gore only improved on this in 2000. In 2004, John Kerry became the first nominee of any party to crack 70% in Cook County since Warren G. Harding in 1920, and the Democrat has never been below 70% in the county since.

In addition, the historically Republican "collar counties" outside Chicago began trending less strongly Republican in the Clinton years, and this continued into the Bush years. In 1996, Clinton became the first Democrat to crack 40% in the largest collar county, DuPage County, since 1964, and Gore slightly improved on Clinton's vote share in 2000, holding Bush to a 13.3% margin in a county Ford had carried by 40.5% in 1976 and George H. W. Bush, by 39.4% in 1988. In 2004, John Kerry improved on Gore's vote share in DuPage County by 2.9%, holding Bush to a single-digit margin of 9.6%--the smallest Republican margin of victory in the county since 1892 (apart from the 1912 election, when the Republican Party was divided and DuPage County voted for Theodore Roosevelt).

Outside the Chicago area, Kerry performed well in the traditionally Democratic region of Metro East, as well as in Champaign County, a moderately populated historically Republican county that has voted Democratic in every election from 1992 on. Bush had done well in most of rural Illinois in 2000, and deepened his support there in 2004, becoming the first Republican since 1980 to carry the Little Egypt counties of Franklin and Gallatin Counties and the first since 1984 to carry Henry, LaSalle, Macon, Macoupin, Montgomery, Perry, and Pulaski Counties. However, given the developments in massively-populated Cook and DuPage Counties, this was not enough to materially influence the result.

As of the 2020 presidential election, this is the last election in which DeKalb County, DuPage County, Kane County, Lake County, Will County, and Winnebago County voted for a Republican presidential candidate.

Results

Results by county

Counties that flipped from Democratic to Republican
Franklin (Largest city: West Frankfort)
Gallatin (Largest city: Shawneetown)
Henry (Largest city: Kewanee)
LaSalle (Largest city: Ottawa)
Macon (Largest city: Decatur)
Macoupin (Largest city: Carlinville)
Montgomery (Largest city: Litchfield)
Perry (Largest city: Du Quoin)
Pulaski (Largest city: Mounds)

By congressional district
Kerry won 10 of the 19 congressional districts, including one that elected a Republican.

Electors

Technically the voters of Illinois cast their ballots for electors: representatives to the Electoral College. Illinois is allocated 21 electors because it has 19 congressional districts and 2 senators. All candidates who appear on the ballot or qualify to receive write-in votes must submit a list of 21 electors, who pledge to vote for their candidate and his or her running mate. Whoever wins the majority of votes in the state is awarded all 21 electoral votes. Their chosen electors then vote for president and vice president. Although electors are pledged to their candidate and running mate, they are not obligated to vote for them. An elector who votes for someone other than his or her candidate is known as a faithless elector.

The electors of each state and the District of Columbia met on December 13, 2004, to cast their votes for president and vice president. The Electoral College itself never meets as one body. Instead the electors from each state and the District of Columbia met in their respective capitols.

The following were the members of the Electoral College from Illinois. All were pledged to and voted for Kerry and Edwards:
 Constance A. Howard
 Carrie Austin
 Shirley R. Madigan
 Tony Munoz
 James DeLeo
 Joan Brennan
 Vera Davis
 Linda Pasternak
 William Marovitz
 Dan Pierce
 Debbie Halvorson
 Molly McKenzie
 Beth Ann May
 Mary Lou Kearns
 Lynn Foster
 John Nelson
 Mary Boland
 Shirley McCombs
 Jerry Sinclair
 Barbara Flynn Currie
 John Daley

References

Illinois
2004
2004 Illinois elections